Interstate 40 (I-40), a major east–west route of the Interstate Highway System, runs east–west through Albuquerque in the US state of New Mexico. It is the direct replacement for the historic U.S. Highway 66 (US 66).

Route description

Arizona to Albuquerque

As I-40 enters New Mexico in a northeasterly direction, it begins following the basin of the intermittent Puerco River (Rio Puerco of the West, as opposed to the Rio Puerco of the East that it crosses near Albuquerque), roughly tracing the southern edge of the contiguous part of the Navajo Reservation in the state. The freeway enters Gallup  later, paralleling the Burlington Northern Santa Fe Railway's southern transcontinental mainline.

The highway traverses more of the Navajo Reservation and the Cibola Forest before turning southeast and crossing a malpaís. After serving interchanges near Grants, the freeway, coinciding with the northern boundary of El Malpais National Monument, crosses another malpaís, turns east, and enters the Acoma Indian Reservation, home of the Acoma Pueblo. The route leaves the Acoma Indian Reservation with Mt. Taylor to the north and enters the Laguna Pueblo. Near the interchange with State Road 6 (NM 6), the railway line that accompanies much of the route from the Arizona border diverts to the south while the freeway turns east by northeast toward Albuquerque. The route departs the Laguna Pueblo, briefly transits the Tohajiilee Indian Reservation (a chapter of the Navajo Nation), crosses the Rio Puerco, and begins a steep climb to the top of a mesa marked by several small cinder cones overlooking the Rio Grande rift and Albuquerque.

From Laguna to the Route 66 Casino, I-40 has at-grade intersections with a number of ranch access roads in violation of Interstate Highway standards. These intersections are a vestige that remain from the conversion of US 66 to I-40 during the latter part of the 20th century.

Albuquerque Metro Area
I-40 diverges from the former US 66 alignment (Central Avenue) at an interchange with Atrisco Vista Boulevard on the West Mesa that overlooks Albuquerque. I-40 descends Nine Mile Hill as it enters the city of Albuquerque and intersects 98th Street, NM 345 (Unser Boulevard), and NM 45 (Coors Boulevard) before crossing the Rio Grande. The freeway then skirts the northern edge of Downtown Albuquerque before intersecting I-25 at a five-level stack interchange (Big I). East of I-25, I-40 continues east, then turns southeast, passing through Uptown before intersecting Old US 66 (now signed as NM 333/Central Avenue) at NM 556 (Tramway Boulevard) as it leaves Albuquerque and enters Tijeras Canyon. This section of I-40 is also referred to as the Coronado Freeway.

Albuquerque to Texas

Continuing east, I-40 descends out of the mountains and into the Estancia Valley while passing through the town of Edgewood (exit 187). The highway continues east across the Estancia Valley, passing through Moriarty (exits 194, 196, and 197). East of Clines Corners (exit 218), I-40 gradually descends from the Pedrenal Hills region and into the High Plains of eastern New Mexico. At Santa Rosa (exits 273, 275, and 277), I-40 crosses the Pecos River and then continues east-northwestward cosigned with US 54 to Tucumcari. At Tucumcari, I-40 diverges from US 54 and turns eastward and skirts the northern edge of San Jon before reaching the Texas state line at Glenrio.

History

Planning and construction of I-40 through New Mexico began shortly after the Federal Highway Act of 1956 created the Interstate Highway System. First sections of I-40 through the state were completed by 1960, including a short section west of Tucumcari in Quay County, from a point just west of Santa Rosa west past Clines Corners to just east of Moriarty, along with a section on the eastside of Albuquerque and another section from near Cubero to Grants, which included a new spur route connecting the Interstate Highway with US 66 on that city's eastside. Construction of I-40, generally paralleling the existing US 66 in some sections and replacing the older route in others, was hobbled for a few years during this decade by the New Mexico Legislature's passage of an Anti-Bypassing Law that prohibited the construction of an Interstate bypass around a city or town opposed to it. That law was repealed in 1966 following a threat of loss of federal funds and most New Mexico cities along I-40, I-25, and I-10 then worked out agreements with state and federal highway officials in determining where the bypass routes around their municipalities should be located.

By the end of the 1960s, most rural sections of I-40 were completed across the state with the largest exception being a  stretch east of Tucumcari to the Texas border at Glenrio, where traffic was diverted to the old US 66. That section of highway, by this time, became locally and nationally known as "Slaughter Lane" due to tremendous amounts of traffic for a two-lane highway along with rough and narrow paving which led to numerous injury and fatal traffic accidents that reached epidemic numbers in 1968 and 1969. However, aside from a few small villages, such as Montoya, Newkirk, and Cuervo in the eastern portion of the state and Laguna, Budville, and Cubero to the west, no major bypasses had been entirely completed in New Mexico, so traffic was still diverted over the US 66 routes through each of those cities.

In 1970, I-40 was entirely completed through the city of Albuquerque. Other bypasses were completed around various cities through the state, including San Jon (1976) and Tucumcari (1981), Santa Rosa (1972), Moriarty (1973), Grants (1974), and Gallup (1980).

Exit list

See also
Albuquerque Northwest Loop

References

External links

 New Mexico
40
Transportation in McKinley County, New Mexico
Transportation in Cibola County, New Mexico
Transportation in Bernalillo County, New Mexico
Transportation in Santa Fe County, New Mexico
Transportation in Torrance County, New Mexico
Transportation in Guadalupe County, New Mexico
Transportation in Quay County, New Mexico